Daniel Pietta (born 9 December 1986) is a German professional ice hockey forward. He currently plays with ERC Ingolstadt in the Deutsche Eishockey Liga (DEL). He previously played with Krefeld Pinguine from 2003 to 2020.

Playing career
After 17 seasons in the DEL playing exclusively with Krefeld Pinguine, Pietta left his hometown club to embark on a new challenge in signing a one-year contract with ERC Ingolstadt on 17 November 2020.

International career
He most recently represented Germany at the 2018 IIHF World Championship.

Career statistics

Regular season and playoffs

International

References

External links

1986 births
Living people
Füchse Duisburg players
German ice hockey left wingers
ERC Ingolstadt players
Krefeld Pinguine players
Leksands IF players
Sportspeople from Krefeld
Ice hockey players at the 2022 Winter Olympics
Olympic ice hockey players of Germany